Switcha is a beverage made with native limes or lemon, water and sugar made in the Turks and Caicos Islands and is also apart of Bahamian Cuisine. It is a traditional accompaniment of duff. 

A version of the beverage won the 5th Winterfest White Party in 2011. Switcha is also a brand of lemon-lime flavored beverage made in Nassau, Bahamas.

See also

 Lemonade
 Limeade
 Old Sour
 Switchel

References

Bahamian cuisine
Caribbean drinks